Sergio Nichiporuk Kulik (born 24 February 1957) is a retired Paraguayan nationalized Chilean football player and manager who played as a striker.

Playing career
Nichiporuk began playing football in the youth teams of Paraná.  In 1975, he moved to the capital Asunción, where he made his professional debut with Nacional at the age of 18. Nichiporuk also played for local rivals Presidente Hayes and San Lorenzo, before Ñublense manager Manuel Rodríguez Vega signed him in 1980.

After several seasons playing in the Chilean leagues with Ñublense, Santiago Wanderers and Iquique, Nichiporuk moved to Spain. In January 1983, he joined Mallorca where he made 15 appearances for the club during the 1982–83 Segunda División season.

Nichiporuk joined Magallanes during 1984, but suffered a broken leg which limited his ability to play over the remainder of his career. After a spell with La Serena in 1986, he moved to Mexico to join Atlante F.C. where he made six appearances for the club during the 1987–88 Primera División season. He returned to Chile and finished his career with Lota Schwager, scoring 12 goals during the 1990 season.

Coaching career
A few years after retiring from professional football, Nichiporuk began coaching Tercera División side Municipal Las Condes. In 1995 he began his professional coaching career with Cobresal. He has led Cobresal on several occasions, winning promotion to the Primera División in 1998, and leading the club to a famous victory over Antofagasta on his Clausura 2006 debut. Nichiporuk led Santiago Morning to the 2000 Copa Apertura Final, losing 2–1 to U. de Chile. He also won promotion with Puerto Montt in 2002.

References

External links
 Sergio Nichiporuk at MemoriaWanderers.cl 

1957 births
Living people
People from Itapúa Department
Paraguayan footballers
Club Nacional footballers
Club Presidente Hayes footballers
Club Sportivo San Lorenzo footballers
Ñublense footballers
Santiago Wanderers footballers
Deportes Iquique footballers
RCD Mallorca players
Deportes Magallanes footballers
Magallanes footballers
Deportes La Serena footballers
Unión San Felipe footballers
Lota Schwager footballers
Atlante F.C. footballers
Paraguayan Primera División players
Paraguayan Segunda División players
Primera B de Chile players
Chilean Primera División players
Segunda División players
Liga MX players
Tercera División de Chile players
Paraguayan expatriate footballers
Paraguayan expatriate sportspeople in Chile
Paraguayan expatriate sportspeople in Spain
Paraguayan expatriate sportspeople in Mexico
Expatriate footballers in Chile
Expatriate footballers in Spain
Expatriate footballers in Mexico
Paraguayan football managers
Paraguayan emigrants to Chile
Naturalized citizens of Chile
Chilean football managers
Cobresal managers
Deportes Concepción (Chile) managers
Santiago Morning managers
Deportes Puerto Montt managers
O'Higgins F.C. managers
San Marcos de Arica managers
Lota Schwager managers
Primera B de Chile managers
Chilean Primera División managers
Association football forwards